The Zeppelin is a 1933 painting by the Dutch painter Carel Willink. It shows a street corner where four men look up to the sky and wave to a zeppelin.

Subject and composition

The Zeppelin shows a zeppelin in the air, seen from a street corner where four men look to the sky and wave. The airship is the Graf Zeppelin, a German zeppelin that flew over Amsterdam on 14 October 1929. Willink created his painting The Zeppelin four years later. The location is the corner of the streets  and P.C. Hooftstraat in Amsterdam.

Reception and provenance
After the outbreak of World War II, The Zeppelin was sometimes interpreted as prophetic, as it had been made the same year Adolf Hitler came to power and the zeppelin could be seen as a symbol for Germany. Willink was however unwilling to comment on any such interpretation, instead explaining: "The heart of my work is a deadly love for reality".

The Zeppelin is owned by the businessman Hans Melchers. It is on public display at the Museum MORE in Gorssel.

The Zeppelin was the inspiration behind the electronic music track "The Zeppelin" by René van der Wouden, made for the 2011 compilation album Dutch Masters initiated by Synth.nl. After this Wouden produced an entire album themed around zeppelins.

References

1933 paintings
Paintings in Gelderland
Paintings by Carel Willink